The Jelly Jam is an American progressive rock trio super group, consisting of King's X member Ty Tabor on guitar and vocals, Winger and Dixie Dregs member Rod Morgenstein  on drums, and Dream Theater member John Myung on bass guitar.

Their first album, The Jelly Jam, was released by InsideOut Music in 2002. Their second album, The Jelly Jam 2, followed in 2004.

Members
 Ty Tabor - guitars, vocals
 John Myung - bass guitar
 Rod Morgenstein - drums, percussion

Discography
 The Jelly Jam (2002)
 The Jelly Jam 2 (2004)
 Shall We Descend (2011)
 Profit (2016)

References

American progressive rock groups
Musical groups established in 2002
2002 establishments in the United States
Inside Out Music artists